Alphen en Riel is a former municipality in the Dutch province of North Brabant. It covered the villages of Alphen and Riel. In 1997, the municipality was divided between the new municipality of Alphen-Chaam, and the municipality of Goirle.

Municipalities of the Netherlands disestablished in 1997
Former municipalities of North Brabant
Alphen-Chaam
Goirle